Karla Karch-Gailus (born 26 August 1964 in Vancouver, British Columbia) is a Canadian former basketball player who competed in the 1996 Summer Olympics and in the 2000 Summer Olympics.

Awards and honors

University
Top 100 U Sports women's basketball Players of the Century (1920-2020).

1986-87 CIS Championship Tournament All-Star 
1986-87 Canada West Second Team All-Star 

1987-88 CIS Second Team All-Canadian 
1987-88 Canada West First Team All-Star

References

1964 births
Living people
Basketball players at the 1996 Summer Olympics
Basketball players at the 2000 Summer Olympics
Canadian women's basketball players
Olympic basketball players of Canada
Basketball players from Vancouver